Judge Mills Lane is a syndicated American television series and arbitration-based reality court show that ran in first-run syndication from August 17, 1998 to September 7, 2001. Reruns later aired on The National Network (TNN) and currently on Pluto TV. The show was produced by John Tomlin and Bob Young for Hurricane Entertainment Group. Judge Mills Lane was distributed by Rysher Entertainment (until 1999) for its first season and Paramount Domestic Television for its last two.

Synopsis 
The show was presided over by former Nevada district court judge Mills Lane, who is more widely known for being a professional boxing referee. The introduction to the series' first season mentioned Lane's connection to both boxing and the law. Lane's catchphrase "let's get it on" was used to open each case and if he found one of the litigants to be out of line, he would tell them that if they didn't stop, "your case is gone."

Judge Mills Lane premiered at a time when court shows were starting to see a large revival. The show could not find secure enough footing in an increasingly crowded market and was cancelled after three seasons.

Television series by CBS Studios
Court shows
First-run syndicated television programs in the United States
1998 American television series debuts
2001 American television series endings
2000s American reality television series
1990s American reality television series